Midlands English refers to a number of distinct dialects spoken in the English Midlands. It may refer to:

East Midlands English
West Midlands English

It may also be confused with:
Midland American English